Mishlesh is a rural locality (a selo) in Rutulsky District, Republic of Dagestan, Russia. The population was 1,182 as of 2010. There are 6 streets.

Geography 
Mishlesh is located on the right bank of the Samur River, 41 km northwest of Rutul (the district's administrative centre) by road. Muslakh and Tsakhur are the nearest rural localities.

Nationalities 
Tsakhur people live there.

Famous residents 
 Garun Ibragimov (Doctor of Philology, Professor of the Dagestan Pedagogical Institute)
 Achley Ramazan (leader of the Zakatala uprising in 1830)

References 

Rural localities in Rutulsky District